Novodevichy may refer to:

 Novodevichy Cemetery, Moscow
 Novodevichy Cemetery (Saint Petersburg)
 Novodevichy Convent, Moscow